Neshoba is an unincorporated community located in Neshoba County, Mississippi, United States.

The community takes its name from the county in which it is located.

In 1971, Neshoba had one of only two operating post offices in the county. It has since closed, leaving only one post office in Philadelphia. During its peak in the early 20th century, the county had as many as 40 small post offices operating at the same time.

References

Unincorporated communities in Neshoba County, Mississippi
Unincorporated communities in Mississippi
Mississippi placenames of Native American origin